Marcus Stone  (4 July 1840 – 24 March 1921) was an English painter. Stone was born in London, and was educated at the Royal Academy.

Life
Marcus Clayton Stone was the son of Frank Stone ARA. Marcus was trained by his father and began to exhibit at the Royal Academy, before he was eighteen. A few years later he illustrated, with much success, books by Charles Dickens, Anthony Trollope, and other writers who were friends of his family.

Stone was elected an Associate of the Royal Academy in 1877, and Academician in 1887. In his earlier pictures, he dealt much with historical incidents, but in his later work, he occupied himself chiefly with a particular type of dainty sentiment, treated with much charm, refinement and executive skill.

One of his canvases is in Tate. Most of his works have been engraved, and medals were awarded to him at exhibitions in all parts of the world.

Stone and fellow painter Luke Fildes both lived in Melbury Road, Holland Park, in houses designed by Richard Norman Shaw. A blue plaque commemorates Stone at his house at 8 Melbury Road. In 1871, at Marylebone, Stone married Laura Mary H Broun, the daughter of the New Zealand merchant William Brown.

Gallery

Notes

References

Further reading
Alfred Lys Baldry, Life and Work of Marcus Stone, R.A., Art Journal office, 1896.

External links

 
 
 
 Profile on Royal Academy of Arts Collections

1840 births
1921 deaths
19th-century English painters
English male painters
20th-century English painters
Artists' Rifles soldiers
Royal Academicians
20th-century English male artists
19th-century English male artists